The 2015 Imo State gubernatorial election was the 8th gubernatorial election of Imo State. Held on April 11, 2015 and April 25, 2015 due to inconclusive, the All Progressives Congress nominee Rochas Okorocha won the election, defeating Emeka Ihedioha of the People's Democratic Party.

APC primary
APC candidate, Rochas Okorocha clinched the party ticket. The  APC primary election was held in 2014.

PDP primary
PDP candidate, Emeka Ihedioha clinched the party ticket. The PDP primary election was held in 2014.

Results 
A total of 22 candidates contested in the election. Rochas Okorocha from the All Progressives Congress won the election, defeating Emeka Ihedioha from the People's Democratic Party. Valid votes was 782,528, votes cast was 806,764.

References 

Imo State gubernatorial elections
Imo gubernatorial
April 2015 events in Nigeria